Muhammad Yunus (born 1940) is a Bangladeshi economist and  founder of the Grameen Bank, and a Nobel Peace Prize laureate.

Mohammad Younus (or variants such as Mohammad, Mohammed, Muhammad and Yunus, Younis) may refer to:

 Mohammad Yunus (diplomat) (1916–2001), Indian ambassador 
 Mohammad Yunus (politician) (1884–1952), first Prime Minister (Premier) of Bihar, India
 Mohammad Yunus (umpire) (1915–1992), Indian cricket umpire
 Mohammad Yunus Khalis (c. 1919–2006), Afghan politician
 Muhammad Yunus Nawandish, current mayor of Kabul, Afghanistan
 Mohammad Yunus Saleem (1912–2004), Indian politician
 Yunus Qanuni (born 1957), Afghan politician
 Mohammad Yunus (academic) (died 2004), professor of Economics at Rajshahi University, murdered in 2004
 Mohammad Yunus (Bangladeshi politician), Bangladesh Nationalist Party politician

See also
 Mohammad Younis Khan (born 1977), Pakistani cricketer
 Mohammad Younus Shaikh (born 1952), Pakistani doctor and human rights activist
 Mohammad Younus Shaikh (author) (born 1965), Pakistani writer 
Yunus (disambiguation)